Azamara Quest is an  that entered service for Azamara Cruises on 24 October 2007. She was built in 2000 for Renaissance Cruises as R Seven. Following the collapse of Renaissance Cruises in 2001 she was laid up for two years, until chartered to the Germany-based Delphin Seereisen as Delphin Renaissance.

In 2006 she was sold to the Spain-based Pullmantur Cruises and renamed Blue Moon. She sailed for Pullmantur until 2007 when she was transferred to Azamara Cruises.

The Azamara Quest carries about 710 passengers (double occupancy) plus 410 crew members (1:2 staff to guest ratio). Her first season was in the Caribbean.  Due to her small size, she is able to call at some of the lesser-visited ports such as St. Barts and Guadeloupe.

Sisterships: Azamara Journey, Azamara Pursuit, MS Insignia, MS Sirena, MS Regatta, MS Nautica, Pacific Princess.

Effects of the worldwide pandemic 
In 2020, due to the worldwide COVID-19 pandemic, sailings were suspended, on various dates in the various regions, by all cruise lines. As of 12 January 2021, a report indicated that Azamara was suspending all sailings "through April 30". From June 2020 until 26 July 2021, Azamara Quest was berthed in Glasgow's King George V Dock along with two of her sister ships Azamara Journey and Azamara Pursuit while cruise sailing was suspended.

2012 fire
In March 2012 the ship suffered a fire in one of the engine rooms which temporarily disabled the ship, carrying 1,001 passengers and crew in waters south of the Philippines.

Five crew were injured in the fire, which broke out on 30 March 2012 at 8:19pm EDT, a day after the ship left Manila for Sandakan, Malaysia.  It was limited to the engine room and "quickly contained", according to Azamara.  None of the passengers were injured.

Many guests praised the efforts of the crew and the entertainment department for keeping spirits high immediately following the harrowing experience.

In popular culture
In 2015, the Azamara Journey and the Azamara Quest were the ships used by television presenter and biologist Nigel Marven for his UKTV documentary and travel program Cruise Ship Adventures with Nigel Marven. The program highlighted wildlife areas at popular cruise destinations.

Gallery

References

External links

Official website
"Azamara Quest" – review by Jane Archer in The Daily Telegraph, London.
Azamara Quest current position

Ships of Azamara Cruises
Ships built by Chantiers de l'Atlantique
2000 ships